The Macon City Council is the city council of Macon, Georgia. Miriam Paris is the Council President, and James E. Timley is the President Pro-Tem. The current council clerk is Joyce Humphrey.

Current members

Ward 1
 Rick Hutto (since 2007), Post 1
 Lonnie Miley (since 2007), Post 2
 Elaine Lucas (since 1991, previously from 1983-1987), Post 3

Ward 2
 James E. Timley (since 1999), Post 1
 J. Michael Cranford (since March 15, 2005 by special election), Post 2
 Ed DeFore (since 1971), Post 3

Ward 3
 Larry Schlesinger (since 2007), Post 1
 Alveno Ross (since unknown), Post 2
 Tom Ellington (since 2007), Post 3

Ward 4
 Miriam Paris (since August 2006), Post 1 (Council President)
 Charles Jones (since 1999), Post 2
 Virgil Watkins (since 2007), Post 3

Ward 5
 Lauren Benedict (since 2007), Post 1
 Nancy White (since 2006), Post 2
 Erick Erickson (since 2007), Post 3

See also
 Macon, Georgia municipal election, 2007

External links
 Council website

Georgia city councils
Macon, Georgia